Tanacetipathes is a genus of corals belonging to the family Myriopathidae.

The species of this genus are found in Atlantic Ocean.

Species:

Tanacetipathes barbadensis 
Tanacetipathes cavernicola 
Tanacetipathes hirta 
Tanacetipathes longipinnula 
Tanacetipathes spinescens 
Tanacetipathes squamosa 
Tanacetipathes tanacetum 
Tanacetipathes thalassoros 
Tanacetipathes thamnea 
Tanacetipathes wirtzi

References

Myriopathidae
Hexacorallia genera